Parker Mills Pond is a  pond in Wareham, Massachusetts. The Wankinco River flows through the pond. Additionally, Harlow Brook flows into the pond. The water quality is impaired due to non-native aquatic plants and non-native fish. Route 25 runs through the northern part of the pond just east of the highway's terminus with Interstates 195 and 495, and Route 28 runs along the southern shore of the pond.

References

External links
Environmental Protection Agency

Wareham, Massachusetts
Ponds of Plymouth County, Massachusetts
Ponds of Massachusetts